Krummavísa (English: Raven Verse) or Krummi krunkar úti (English: A Raven Croaks Outside) is an Icelandic folk song or nursery rhyme.

As with all traditional Icelandic poetry, Krummavísa conforms to the set of rules called bragfræði (prosody). According to this system, a poem must be alliterative: a line of verse must have two words beginning with the same letter, and the first word of the next line must also begin with the same letter. Here, for example, the first line has two words beginning with a K (krummi and krunkar) and the first word of the second line also begins with a K (kallar).

References

Icelandic folk music
Icelandic children's songs
1906 songs
Songwriter unknown